Sergiu Răilean (born 12 April 1976) is a Moldovan politician. He served as Minister of Economy and Infrastructure from 16 March 2020 to 9 November 2020 in the cabinet of Prime Minister Ion Chicu. Anatol Usatîi was appointed as his successor.

References 

Living people
Year of birth missing (living people)
Place of birth missing (living people)
Moldovan Ministers of Economy
21st-century Moldovan politicians